Jhonlin Air Transport is a regional airline in Indonesia that focus on serving the areas in South Kalimantan, Indonesia. The maiden flight of the airline began on November 3, 2011. The inaugural flight route starts from Batulicin to Banjarbaru.

Fleet
As of February 22, 2022, Jhonlin Air Transport has only 3 aircraft fixed wing :

 1 Boeing 737-700 BBJ series
 2 Beechcraft Super King Air 350

The former fleet of Jhonlin Air Transport is
 3 Helicopter Bell 407
 1 Helicopter Bell 429
 3 Cessna Grand Caravan
 2 Hawker 900XP
 1 ATR 72

Accidents
The Hawker 900XP PK-JBH one of the two belonging to the company was involved in an accident in February 2013 while landing at Halim airport in Jakarta. The aircraft lost the left landing gear on impact.

A Cessna Grand Caravan 208-EX PK-JBR also crashed in Papua in October 2018 carrying a passenger named Daus in Beoga, Puncak Regency in Papua.

References

External links
Website JAT-Airlines

Airlines of Indonesia
Airlines established in 2011
Airlines formerly banned in the European Union
Indonesian companies established in 2011